Kolkata Knight Riders (KKR) is a franchise cricket team based in Kolkata, India, which plays in the Indian Premier League (IPL). They were one of the ten teams that competed in the 2011 Indian Premier League. They were captained by Gautam Gambhir. Kolkata Knight Riders finished 4th in the IPL and qualified for the Champions League T20 for the first time.

Background 
In this edition of the IPL, the Kolkata Knight Riders decided to revamp the team, starting with a new look and by changing the entire set of players. Gautam Gambhir, who was bought for a record-breaking $2.4 million was appointed as skipper. KKR also managed to buy Yusuf Pathan for $2.1 million. Other international names added to the squad included allrounders Shakib Al Hasan and Jacques Kallis, pace bowler Brett Lee and Ryan ten Doeschate of Netherlands. Brad Haddin was replaced by Mark Boucher in mid-season due to a finger injury he sustained during practice.

The Kolkata Knight Riders had a disappointing start of season, losing to Chennai Super Kings by 2 runs. But they came back stronger, winning their next three matches against Deccan Chargers and Rajasthan Royals at Kolkata and Jaipur respectively. After two consecutive defeats in their home ground, the team had a string of wins against Delhi Daredevils, Kings XI Punjab and Deccan Chargers. They went on to win two of the remaining four matches; one against Chennai Super Kings in Kolkata and the other against Pune Warriors India in Navi Mumbai which enabled them to qualify for the playoffs for the first time. In the eliminator they lost to Mumbai Indians owing to a last over by Lakshmipathy Balaji which conceded 21 runs, losing their chance to enter the finals for the first time.

In the 2011 auctions, Sourav Ganguly was not picked by KKR, nor by any other team in the league. This created a huge uproar in Kolkata. The angry fans created a protest group called No Dada No KKR. This was followed by a silent protest rally, signature campaigns throughout the country and abroad and stadium protests. But the uproar came to a halt and the fans' reactions gradually bettered as the team's performance improved and the Eden Gardens began to witness huge capacities. KKR finished the top amongst all teams after the completion of the mid season game-play.

Champions League Twenty20

KKR's top four finish meant they would now participate in the qualifying stage for the 2011 Champions League Twenty20, held from 19 to 21 September. Captain Gautam Gambhir wasn't able to lead the team during the qualifying stage, as he has been recovering from an injury he sustained during a Test match between India and England at The Oval. Jacques Kallis was the appointed captain in Gambhir's absence. However, Gambhir returned to lead the team in the Group stage. KKR was also without the services of Eoin Morgan, who was due to have a shoulder surgery, and Mark Boucher who was playing for Warriors.

They were drawn along with Somerset and Auckland Aces in Pool B of qualification stage. Both of their matches were initially to be played at the Eden Gardens in Kolkata, but was later moved to the Rajiv Gandhi International Cricket Stadium in Hyderabad. They recorded a 2-run victory in their first match against Auckland Aces, thanks to brilliant spells from Iqbal Abdulla and Yusuf Pathan. Their next match against Somerset Sabres ended in an 11-run defeat. However, both teams qualified for the main tournament by finishing on a better NRR+ than Sri Lankan franchise Ruhuna Rhinos of Pool A.

The team was placed with Somerset, Southern Redbacks, Warriors and fellow IPL team Royal Challengers Bangalore in Group B of the tournament. They lost their first two matches against Somerset Sabres and Southern Redbacks. They made an impressive comeback by winning the last two games, first by 9 wickets against Royal Challengers Bangalore and a rain affected 22 run victory by (D/L) against Warriors. However, despite being tied on points, they could not make the semi-final due to a lesser NRR+ than the Royal Challengers. They ended up fifth on the overall points table.

Indian Premier League

Season standings
Kolkata Knight Riders finished 4th in the league stage of IPL 2011.

Match log

Champions League Twenty20

Match log

References

2011 Indian Premier League
Kolkata Knight Riders seasons